Src homology 2 domain containing F is a protein that in humans is encoded by the SHF gene.

References

Further reading